Northstar (Jean-Paul Beaubier) is a fictional superhero appearing in American comic books published by Marvel Comics. Created by Chris Claremont and John Byrne, the character first appeared in X-Men #120 (April 1979) as a member of the Canadian superhero team, Alpha Flight.

Northstar is a member of a fictional subspecies of humanity known as mutants, who are born with superhuman abilities. The character possesses the ability to travel at superhuman speeds, fly, and project photonic energy blasts. His twin sister, Aurora, possesses similar abilities. Although the character was initially depicted as a member of Alpha Flight, he has appeared regularly as a member of the X-Men since joining the team of mutants in The Uncanny X-Men #414 (December 2002).

The character is one of the first openly gay superheroes in American comic books, and the first openly gay character to come out in a book published by Marvel Comics. He married his husband, Kyle Jinadu, in Astonishing X-Men #51 (June 2012), which was the first depiction of a same-sex wedding in mainstream comics.

Publication history

1979–1994
Northstar debuted in The Uncanny X-Men #120 (April 1979) as part of the Canadian government sponsored team Alpha Flight, who sought to take Wolverine of the X-Men into custody. In 1983, Alpha Flight went on to star in its own comic, with Northstar as a charter member. In addition to the Alpha Flight comic and associated annuals, Northstar and other members of the team made numerous guest appearances in other titles, particularly Uncanny X-Men and Wolverine. Northstar was also featured in miniseries including two X-Men and Alpha Flight series and Secret Wars II.

Creator John Byrne was reluctant to produce an initial run of the 1983 Alpha Flight comic series for lack of developed and compelling characters. They had no back-stories and were created as nothing more than a team to face the X-Men. So in order to make the team less two-dimensional and more developed, Northstar's sexual orientation was subtly introduced into the start of the new Alpha Flight series. Although Byrne had intended the character to be gay, he was restricted to implied hints of this fact, due to Marvel editor-in-chief Jim Shooter's policy against openly homosexual characters, and by the Comics Code Authority. For example, in Alpha Flight #18, when Northstar's residence is called by Heather Hudson, a half-naked man in swim trunks who had been swimming with Northstar answers the phone, while in Alpha Flight #41, Northstar's sister Aurora says to her brother, "Since when do you object to having attractively-dressed men about, my brother?" Northstar's apparent lack of interest in women was implied to be due to his obsessive drive to win as a ski champion, and writer Bill Mantlo's later attempt to reveal that Northstar had AIDS was squelched. In Alpha Flight #106 (1992), writer Scott Lobdell was finally given permission to have Northstar state, "I am gay."

As the first major, openly gay character created by Marvel Comics, Northstar generated significant publicity in the mainstream press, and Alpha Flight #106 sold out in a week, although the series was not a very popular title. It is the only comic book issue to have been inducted into the Gaylactic Hall of Fame. The event was also controversial, and almost no mention was made of his sexual orientation for the remainder of the first Alpha Flight series, which ended with issue #130 in 1994. One exception was a subplot in which his sister Aurora—experiencing a split personality—accepted his homosexuality in one personality, while rejecting it in the other. After the cancellation of Alpha Flight, Northstar appeared in his own miniseries, which uses his mutancy as allegory and sexuality as subtext. Interactions between Northstar and other gay characters have been depicted, such as in a Marvel Swimsuit Special, in which he is shown socializing with the gay Pantheon member Hector.

1994–present

After the 1994 cancellation of Alpha Flight, Northstar starred in an eponymous four issue limited series. In 1997 a second on-going series of Alpha Flight was initiated. Northstar was not initially a member of this group, but appeared in later issues searching for his missing sister Aurora. He featured in eight issues before the series cancellation with issue #20.

In 2005, Marvel killed Northstar in three separate continuities within the space of one calendar month. Between February 16 and March 9, 2005, versions of Northstar were killed in the Earth-616-based Wolverine #25, and in X-Men: Age of Apocalypse and X-Men: The End (a possible story of the X-Men's final days; Northstar was one of many to die in the series), both of which were set in alternate timelines. Northstar did not stay dead long in Marvel's primary continuity, as he is resurrected in Wolverine #26.

When Northstar rejoined the X-Men as a regular member in 2002, writers were less hesitant to address his sexual orientation. Northstar even experienced a crush on long-time X-Man Iceman, though it was unrequited. One of his students in the Alpha Squadron, Victor Borkowski, the gay mutant Anole, looks up to him as a role model.  When Northstar rejoined the X-Men yet again in 2009, he was revealed to be in a relationship with his sports company's events manager Kyle. Their relationship faces strain from the remaining mutants' exodus to the mutant island Utopia, though the two agree to work through their issues. It was later implied that he also had a sexual relationship with Hercules at an unspecified point in time.

Northstar and Kyle's marriage in issue #51 of Astonishing X-Men, drew attention from the right-wing group One Million Moms.

Fictional character biography 

Jean-Paul Beaubier is born to a French Canadian family in Montreal. After his parents die in an automobile accident during his childhood, he and his twin sister, Jeanne-Marie, are separated. Jean-Paul is adopted, but his adopted parents are killed after only a couple of years. Before his debut as a superhero, Beaubier competes as a professional skier (reaching elite level skier as a teenager, prior to his mutation surfacing). Once he develops his mutant abilities he becomes virtually unbeatable and eventually bores of the sport due to the lack of competition. He becomes an angry and rebellious youth. In young adulthood he joins the Front de libération du Québec (a militant separatist movement for Quebec from Canada) but soon becomes disgusted with, and renounces, the group's violent tactics. He learns of a superhero group financed by the Canadian government called: "Alpha Flight".

Alpha Flight
Jean-Paul joins Alpha Flight, adopting the codename Northstar. There he is reunited with his sister Jeanne-Marie (“Aurora”). Northstar's comic debut occurs in The Uncanny X-Men #120, as a member of Alpha Flight fighting the X-Men to capture former teammate Wolverine. When Northstar meets his old friend Raymond Belmonde (a man who took him in and mentored him) he introduces Aurora to Belmonde, only for the twins to be attacked by local crime boss Deadly Ernest, who kills Belmonde. The twins deal with the villain, though their relationship sours when Northstar offends Aurora by asking if she had “romanced her way to safety". Aurora refuses to speak to him, and her lover and teammate Sasquatch assists in a power alteration, allowing her to generate light without Northstar. Her attempts to isolate him cause Northstar to quit Alpha Flight. Later, Aurora seeks him out & the twins begin to reconcile, but Aurora rejects him again after discovering his FLQ history. Alpha Flight cross-examine him about his FLQ activities, but are interrupted by an emergency. When Sasquatch dies, the twins reconcile after Northstar comforts his grieving sister. However, during a confrontation with the Hulk, Aurora discovers that her power alterations cause the twins to negate one another's abilities upon touching. After the battle, Northstar rejoins Alpha Flight.

While on a skiing vacation, Northstar must expose his mutant powers to save a woman's life. Accused of using his powers to cheat in competition & realizing he could never know if he subconsciously had, he relinquishes his medals and bitterly turns his back on skiing.

The villain Pestilence senses decay in Northstar's body and causes his sickness to grow serious to the point that his wounds no longer heal, slowly killing him. As his illness progresses, Aurora desperately uses her healing light to cure him. The Asgardian Loki fools the Beaubier twins into believing that their mother was an elf from Asgard. When Aurora is thought lost in action, Northstar travels to Asgard (seeking this heritage) but is trapped there. Loki had sent a depowered Aurora to a convent (in an attempt to appease Those Who Sit Above In Shadow). When a supernatural threat mobilizes Alpha Flight, the sorceress Talisman sends Aurora to Asgard to rescue Northstar. He shares the light with her, restoring their powers (allowing both to independently generate light).

During another battle, Northstar discovers an abandoned baby girl. Doctors discover that she is dying of AIDS, after HIV infection in the womb. Jean-Paul adopts her and names her Joanne Beaubier. Alpha Flight perform various events to remind the public of AIDS and the dangers of silence about it. Her death weeks later spurs Northstar to publicly acknowledge his homosexuality, hoping that, as a gay celebrity, he can increase media attention on HIV/AIDS safety and prevention. Eventually Northstar leaves Alpha Flight and writes a memoir about his experience as a mutant and gay man entitled Born Normal.

X-Men
In the 2001 "Eve of Destruction" story arc, Northstar is briefly recruited to an improvized team of X-Men by Jean Grey to rescue Professor X, who has been captured by Magneto and is being kept prisoner in Genosha. Jean meets Northstar at a book-signing appearance, where he is mobbed. One person in the crowd turns out to be carrying a gun. Northstar foils his own assassination attempt at super-speed. Later, he meets one of the new mutants, an invulnerable young man called "Omerta", whose extreme homophobia leads to an actual fight between the two on X-Men's mansion driveway.

At Professor Xavier's request, Northstar then works with the X-Men to save the life of a mutant child who cannot stop exploding. Despite his speed, Northstar cannot save the boy, who perishes simply because of his powers. Soon afterwards, Northstar officially joins the X-Men, and becomes an instructor at the Xavier Institute, teaching business, economics, French, and superpowered flight classes. Northstar becomes a mentor to his own squad of young mutants, Alpha Squadron, and forms a close mentor relationship with student Anole. During his time at Xavier's, he forms a close friendship with Annie Ghazikhanian, a former nurse at the Xavier Institute. Annie realizes that Northstar has developed an attraction to Bobby Drake. Bobby remains oblivious, despite Northstar, who was currently sick, saving him from the misguided anger of a jealous mutant.

When HYDRA forms an alliance with the cults the Dawn of the White Light and the Hand, the groups start recruiting new agents from the superhero community by killing, resurrecting, and brainwashing them. The X-Man Wolverine is one of their victims, brainwashed into becoming a HYDRA assassin. He eventually attacks the X-Men and kills Northstar. One of the New Mutants, Elixir, manages to heal Northstar's wounds but is unable to revive him. A few days later a statue of Northstar is placed in a garden of statues of fallen X-Men on the campus grounds. S.H.I.E.L.D. requests that Northstar be decapitated (to prevent resurrection) but his corpse is stolen by Elektra, another brainwashed victim of HYDRA. A resurrected Northstar leads an attack with Elektra on the S.H.I.E.L.D. Helicarrier, crippling S.H.I.E.L.D. and putting Nick Fury in critical condition. Northstar also takes the time to kill racists and homophobes all across the country, and uses his regained 'flash' ability to generate a brief blinding light. Wolverine meets Northstar, but is taken prisoner by the other Dawn of the White Light mutants, all of whom he kills except for Northstar. When Northstar refuses to tell Wolverine the location of HYDRA's command center, Wolverine knocks him out asks S.H.I.E.L.D. to psychologically "deprogram" him.

Not long afterward, the mysterious Children of the Vault abduct Northstar from the S.H.I.E.L.D. holding facility, to use him to kill Sabretooth and the X-Men. They easily are able to control Northstar due to the Hand's previous mental manipulations. Under their control he finds his sister about to commit suicide and stops her so that The Children can mentally control her too. Together they attack the school under The Children's command and make quick work of several X-Men, notably Iceman and Anole, whose encounter with Northstar briefly shakes him from mind-control. Leaving Aurora to battle the X-Men, Northstar begins a search for Sabretooth but is stopped by Rogue and Cable. The X-Men take Northstar and Aurora to the S.H.I.E.L.D. Helicarrier to try to fix their mental damage. Using their V.R. equipment the X-Men allow the twins to relive their lives at an accelerated pace. The process is interrupted near the end of the session by Exodus, creating a telepathic connection between the twins. Using each other's emotional support they apparently manage to face their inner turmoils. This gives both more control of their powers.

X-Men split and reformation 

Northstar is contacted by Cyclops to find Anole (who is in hiding after accidentally attacking his own father due to PTSD from his X-Mansion experiences). Northstar discovers Anole in a tree, the teenager not too happy to see his former mentor. Jean-Paul thinks Victor is having a problem with fitting in, as both a mutant and as a gay teen. Victor explains that his town accepts him for who he is – his problems come from Northstar, along with the other X-Men, for stealing the New X-Men's innocence. Just before departing, he elbows Jean-Paul in the face – similar to how Northstar attacked him in the past – and says that the New X-Men shouldn't look for him.

Northstar and his sister Aurora respond to Emma Frost's telepathic APB and fight alongside the X-Men in San Francisco against the Skrulls when they invade Earth. However, Northstar also makes a life for himself outside of superheroics, having returned to being a star at extreme snowsports, as well as starting his own brand of snow sporting equipment and becoming involved in a relationship. Wolverine approaches Jean-Paul to rejoin the X-Men as its speedster. After confirming that he wouldn't be a token gay member, he accepts. While training Surge in super-speed, Northstar stops to give an interview, where he learns of Simon Trask's Proposition X (a Mutant Breeding Act Ballot Initiative). He runs back to the X-Men and threatens to quit and go back to Canada. However, he remains with the X-Men throughout several missions, including confrontations with Norman Osborn's Dark X-Men and a rescue mission to retrieve Illyana Rasputin after she is banished to Limbo during the events of Second Coming.

A temporal copy of Northstar—from shortly before the apparent death of Guardian at the hands of Jerry Jaxon—was introduced near the end of the third Alpha Flight series, along with an entire team of early Alpha Flight members. This Northstar is last seen with a similarly time-displaced Aurora, still operating in the Earth-616 present.

During the "Chaos War" storyline, Northstar alongside Aurora, Sasquatch, and Snowbird are reunited with a resurrected Guardian, Vindicator, Shaman, and Marrina Smallwood, and they reform Alpha Flight.

Powers and abilities 

Northstar is a mutant who can move and fly at superhuman speed with the potential of reaching near light speeds. He also possesses superhuman stamina, endurance (both essential to maintain super-speed for any length of time), and reflexes. He can channel a portion of the kinetic energy of the atomic motion in his body's molecules in a single direction, accelerating his body to a velocity in direct proportion to the amount of kinetic energy he has tapped. Northstar also has an advanced equilibrium, and exceptional agility, reaction time, and coordination which allows for him to make sharp turns, and run at such speeds without becoming sick. Northstar is also able to punch at great speeds, which grants him the ability to hurt even the Hulk. In an early issue of Alpha Flight Northstar reveals to readers that his sister Aurora has greater endurance and can fly longer, whereas he can fly faster in the same amount of time. Northstar can create cyclones by running in circles, can run up walls and across water, and can breathe while traveling at supersonic speeds. However, if Northstar wanted to travel with someone else at superhuman speeds, they would need a breathing apparatus to keep from asphyxiating.

As a side effect of partially robbing his molecules of their atomic motion, the binding forces within and between the molecules have increased, which enhances the sheer toughness of Northstar's entire body. This effect gives his skin enough durability to withstand speeds up to at least Mach 10 without injury, but the upper limit of this ability has not been measured. It had once been theorized that Northstar could fly at 99% of the speed of light: , although this has never been attempted because he would do irreparable damage to the environment.  While Northstar can withstand Mach 10 speeds, traveling any faster would carry complications with breathing and damage caused by wind and air resistance to his body. When Aurora, his sister, and Northstar are in contact with each other, usually by holding hands, they can also vary the rate of acceleration of his molecules to release a cascade of photons creating a momentary burst of light equal to one million candela which they use to blind their opponents. The only other minor drawback to this ability, other than he and his sister having to be in contact with each other to utilize this gift, is that they are unable to adjust the brilliance of the flash. After being captured by the Children of the Vault in the Supernovas arc of Mike Carey's X-Men, his and Aurora's powers have been enhanced to the point where they can now move at light speed without harm and can generate explosive thermal energy in addition to light.

Northstar is a world-class professional skier, skilled trapeze artist, business man, and an accomplished novelist.  A native French speaker, he is also fluent in English. He is a good hand-to-hand combatant using a style utilizing his superhuman speed, and received coaching from his teammate Puck. After his resurrection by the Hand, Northstar has been trained in the martial arts. Northstar also has peak human strength, but has superhuman strength in his legs.

Northstar wears a costume of synthetic stretch fabric made of special materials for protection from friction and other hazards of superhuman speed.

Reception

Critical reception 
Stacie Rook of Screen Rant said, "Northstar married his husband in the comics in 2012, in what was the first depiction of a same-sex wedding in marvel comics. His position as the first openly gay Marvel character is important for the history of representation, and an on-screen portrayal of him would be a great way to honor that milestone."

Volumes 
The issue of Alpha Flight in which Northstar came out was hugely popular. New York magazine reported that a store on Bleecker Street in New York City resorted to making customers who wanted to buy a copy of it to purchase a second comic as well. Later, they changed the policy to require that everyone who bought a copy had to buy an issue of the series The Punisher War Zone as well. The store claimed they did this to prevent hoarding of the comic. The policy was in effect for thirty minutes until the store was all sold out. In the end, they have received only one complaint.

Accolades 

 In 2014, Entertainment Weekly ranked Northstar 51st in their "Let's rank every X-Man ever" list.
 In 2014, BuzzFeed ranked Northstar 40th in their "95 X-Men Members Ranked From Worst To Best" list.
 In 2016, Screen Rant ranked Northstar and Aurora 8th in their "12 Fastest Superheroes Of All Time" list.
 In 2018, CBR.com ranked Northstar 17th in their "25 Fastest Characters In The Marvel Universe" list.
 In 2019, CBR.com ranked Northstar 8th in their "Alpha Flight: The 10 Most Powerful Members of Canada’s Avengers" list.
 In 2020, CBR.com ranked Northstar 7th in their "Marvel: 10 Best Star Athletes Who Became Superheroes" list.
 In 2021, Screen Rant included Northstar in their "10 Fastest X-Men In Marvel Comics" list, in their "10 LGBTQ+ Marvel Heroes That Should Join The MCU" list, and his wedding with Kyle in their "10 Most Important Weddings In Marvel Comics" list.
 In 2022, Newsarama included Northstar in their "20 X-Men characters that should make the jump from Marvel comics to the MCU" list.
 In 2022, Sportskeeda ranked Northstar 3rd in their "5 fastest characters in comic history" list.
 In 2022, CBR.com ranked Northstar 6th in their "X-Men: 10 Queer and Awesome Mutants" list, 7th in their "Marvel: The 20 Fastest Speedsters" list, and 9th in their "10 Most Attractive Marvel Heroes" list.

Other versions

Age of Apocalypse

In the Age of Apocalypse, Northstar and Aurora are part of Mr. Sinister's Elite Mutant Force (E.M.F.) and, as such, are assigned to patrolling the breeding pens. The siblings are rather snotty about their superior status as mutants and seem to take great pleasure in punishing those prisoners who act up or try to escape. When the E.M.F.'s leader, Cyclops, switches sides, secretly helping some inmates to escape, he is caught in the act by the speeding twins.  However, both of them are defeated by Cyclops and the prisoner he was helping to escape, which happens to be Polaris. When the series was revisited for the 10 year anniversary, both Northstar and Aurora are later killed by Weapon X (Wolverine) and Kirika (X-23 in the main Marvel Universe).

Marvel Zombies
In the Marvel Zombies comics set in the universe of Earth-2149, the zombified Alpha Flight attack the X-Men and are eventually killed by Magneto. Northstar is seen in a panel of Marvel Zombies Dead Days attacking the X-Man Storm alongside his sister Aurora. The two are killed by Magneto only moments later.

Ultimate Marvel

In the Ultimate Marvel Universe, his features are similar to his original counterpart, although his ears are no longer pointed. He can also move at super-speed, though he has yet to demonstrate the ability to fly, or any abilities related to light emission.

A student at New York City's Stuyvesant High School, Northstar is kicked off the school's track team for suspected illegal steroid use. In fact, his unnatural levels of speed are actually due to his mutation.  When the X-Men reveal to him he is a mutant and ask him to join them, he turns them down, saying that separating themselves from humans is segregation and noting how a student there (Beast) had been recently killed.

Soon after, Mister Sinister, a deranged man who is apparently under orders of Apocalypse to kill ten mutants, shoots Northstar.  Thanks to his quick reflexes, Northstar manages to survive the attack but is left in a coma. After being hospitalized, he is awakened from his coma by the X-Man Jean Grey. Upon being told that Colossus had watched over him all night to protect him from any further attacks, Northstar asks if Colossus is single, startling Colossus so much that his body involuntarily turns to steel.

Northstar is later recruited by Emma Frost to join the Academy of Tomorrow, a magnet school for gifted children both mutant and human with a more pacifistic and integrationist philosophy than the X-Men. Along with fellow students Lorna Dane and Alex Summers, he completes Frost's Advanced Leadership Workshop, allowing him to make use of his powers performing off-campus community service missions in conjunction with local authorities. When Lorna is framed for murder and imprisoned in the Triskelion (the headquarters of the Ultimates), in an elaborate scheme by Magneto to help him escape the prison, Northstar is part of the group of Frost's students who try to break her out.  During a battle with the Ultimates and the X-Men, he shows that he has improved his abilities enough to move faster than the human eye (allowing him to attack without being seen), run across water (though a direct hit from a super-powered person could cause him to sink), and resist gravity (he is able to run up the side of a tall building).

During the battle he shows romantic interest in Colossus, and a week later it is revealed that the two have kept in contact, having exchanged email addresses. Colossus is shown on the phone talking to Northstar, who asks Colossus to be his date to his school's homecoming dance (which he accepts). But the dance is interrupted by the Brotherhood. After the supposed death of Charles Xavier, Colossus agrees to temporarily live with Northstar at his school.

During a softball game between the Academy of Tomorrow and the Xavier School, Ultimate Alpha Flight shows up to kidnap Northstar. Aurora makes her debut, revealing herself to be Northstar's sister. She physically takes him against his will. Later, Colossus, Cyclops, Rogue, Angel, Dazzler, and Nightcrawler break into Alpha Flight's base to rescue him. After they incapacitate Alpha Flight, Colossus finds Northstar overdosing on the mutant drug, Banshee, resulting in him being crippled from the waist down.

X-Men: The End
In the alternate future of X-Men: The End, Northstar is one of many members of the staff of the Xavier Institute. He briefly survives the destruction of it and several surrounding miles, only to die in Scott Summers' arms. As he passes on, he sees a vision of his Alpha Flight friends, leading is his sister, who encourages him to leave his body.

House of M
In the alternate reality created by the Scarlet Witch known as House of M, Northstar is an agent of S.H.I.E.L.D., responsible for training a squad of young mutants and superhumans in the agency's junior training squad program.  Much like the rest of the super-powered community in House of M, Northstar supported this reality's Magneto and his mutant-supremacy platform.

"Age of X"
In the alternate timeline seen in the "Age of X" storyline, Jean-Paul was on the first team of Fortress X defenders to attack Kitty Pryde when she breached the barriers, while Jean-Paul wants revenge for his sister's murder.

What If?

In "What If Scott Summers and Jean Gray Got Married Sooner?", their leaving inspired the rest of the original X-Men to leave the X-Men as well and seek lives in the outside world. Professor X recruited Northstar as part of a new team, along with Aurora, Storm, Colossus and Catseye. This new team unfortunately died fighting the living island Krakoa. Sunfire and the Avengers defeated it, and found their bodies.

In "What If Wolverine was Leader of Alpha Flight?", Northstar was responsible for Wolverine staying in Canada after his capture by government forces. This story diverged from the story in X-Men 120–121, where Alpha Flight was assigned to capture Wolverine and return him to the service of Canada. As in the mainstream reality, the X-Men (Cyclops, Nightcrawler, Storm, Colossus, Banshee and their associate Colleen Wing) flew off, but here, Wolverine did not escape custody and slip aboard the plane. They circled back to attempt a rescue. The Canadian government tried to call Alpha Flight to handle things before they were forced into military intervention, but Northstar was on monitor duty and refused to take the call (presumably in anger that Cyclops had just beaten him in combat before Wolverine surrendered). Left with no other alternative, the Canadian military shot the X-Men down. None of them survived the crash. James McDonald Hudson learned what Northstar did and concealed it from Wolverine. Left without his new family, Wolverine chose to return to his first one: Alpha Flight. He led the team well, but Northstar was constantly nervous around Wolverine, fearing his wrath if he ever learned the truth. Wolverine did in fact learn- the team battled the Hellfire Club, and Jean Gray as Dark Phoenix revealed the truth. She wanted Wolverine to kill Northstar, but he killed her instead to free her. He forgave Northstar's role in the deaths of his friends and stayed on as leader of Alpha Flight. Northstar became a mainstay of the team once the threat of disembowelment no longer hung over him.

In other media

Television

 Northstar appears in the X-Men episodes "Slave Island", "Repo Man", and the Phoenix Saga's "Child of Light" voiced by Rene Lemieux. No mention or hint is made of his sexual orientation. In the cartoon, Northstar possesses the ability to fly and generate a blinding light when he slaps hands with his sister Aurora. Though he did not have any speaking role in Slave Island, the episode Repo Man showed the character's origins as he spoke with a French Canadian accent. In "Slave Island", Jean-Paul is a hostage/prisoner of the island nation of Genosha. He, along with many other mutants, provides slave labor for the government using their mutant skills for such tasks as building dams. They wear special collars which restrict them from using their powers to escape, and they sleep in prison-like cells. They eventually escape Genosha with the help of the X-Men. In "Repo Man", Northstar is shown as part of the Canadian Special Forces team Alpha Flight, which tries to convince former member Wolverine to rejoin. Northstar and other Alpha Flight members make a brief cameo in "Child of Light".
 Northstar is briefly mentioned in the episode "This Forest Green" of the animated series Super Hero Squad Show.

Video games
 Northstar appears in X-Men: Destiny, voiced by Yuri Lowenthal. The player character on the X-Men's side encounters Northstar during a mission to escort a courier to Gambit and protect him from the Purifiers.
 Northstar appears as an NPC in the video game Marvel Heroes, voiced by Michael Beattie. He is one of the teachers at the Xavier Institute.

Toys 

 An Alpha Flight Northstar and Aurora 2 Pack Figure set was released by ToyBiz as part of three Alpha Flight action figures released as part of the Marvel Collector Editions series in 1999 by Toy Biz. Snowbird and Puck were packaged together while Sasquatch came with Vindicator (Heather Hudson). All three sets came with motion collector's cards.
 In September 2007, Hasbro ran a poll with ToyFare magazine of potential Marvel Legends X-Men prototype figurines, one of which was Northstar in his original costume. Aurora was also a prototype. The Northstar prototype placed 7th out of 8 in the final poll results, with Aurora placing 8th.
 A two-pack set of mini-busts of Aurora and Northstar were due for shipment in October 2008.
 Marvel Legends released a figure of Northstar as part of an Alpha Flight boxset in 2019.

See also

 LGBT characters in comics

Notes

References

External links

 MarvelDatabase:Northstar (Jean-Paul Beaubier)
 MarvelDatabase:Character Gallery Northstar (Jean-Paul Beaubier)
 MarvelDatabase:Northstar (Ultimate)
 AlphaFlight.Net Alphanex Entry On - Northstar
 UncannyXmen.net Spotlight on Northstar

Canadian superheroes
Characters created by Chris Claremont
Characters created by John Byrne (comics)
Comics characters introduced in 1979
Fictional businesspeople
Fictional characters from Montreal
Fictional characters who can manipulate light
Fictional gay males
Fictional schoolteachers
Fictional skiers
Fictional writers
Marvel Comics characters who can move at superhuman speeds
Marvel Comics LGBT superheroes
Marvel Comics male superheroes
Marvel Comics martial artists
Marvel Comics mutants
Marvel Comics orphans
Superheroes who are adopted
Twin characters in comics
X-Men supporting characters